Strangers in the City is a 1962 feature film written, photographed, edited and directed by Rick Carrier. The film was screened at the 1st International Critics' Week of the 1962 Cannes Film Festival.

References

External links

1962 films
1962 drama films
American drama films
Embassy Pictures films
Films scored by Robert Prince
1960s English-language films
1960s American films